Awa Mountain, also Ava Mountain, straddles the border of northern Myanmar and China. The majority of the Wa people live in Awa.

References

Mountain ranges of China
Mountain ranges of Yunnan
Geography of Lincang